The men's 50 yard freestyle was a swimming event held as part of the Swimming at the 1904 Summer Olympics programme. It was the first time the short-distance event was held at the Olympics, and the only time the distance of 50 yards was used.  Subsequent editions of the programme would use a distance of 50 metres, though the short sprint would not reappear until the 1988 Summer Olympics.

Nine swimmers from two nations competed.

Competition format

The competition consisted of two rounds: semifinals and a final. There were two semifinals, with the top 3 swimmers in each semifinal advancing to the final round.

Results

Semifinals

The top three finishers in each heat advanced to the final.  The results of the non-advancing swimmers are unclear, but David Hammond, Edwin Swatek and Bill Orthwein are named by de Wael as possible competitors.

Semifinal 1

Semifinal 2

Final

The final had to be run twice because the first race was too close to determine a winner.

References

Sources

 
 

Swimming at the 1904 Summer Olympics